Asociación Civil Racing Club Trelew (mostly known as Racing de Trelew) is an Argentine sports club, located in the city of Trelew, Chubut Province. The club is mostly known for its football team, which currently plays in the Torneo Argentino B, the regionalised 4th division of the Argentine football league system.

Titles
League of Chubut: 11
1942, 1943, 1944, 1946, 1990, 1994 Apertura, 1994 Clausura, 1997 Apertura, 1997 Clausura, 1998 Apertura, 2000 Apertura

See also
List of football clubs in Argentina
Argentine football league system

External links

Official website 
Racing unofficial page 
Pasión Albirroja 

Football clubs in Chubut Province
Association football clubs established in 1920
1920 establishments in Argentina